Hal Hinte (January 25, 1920 – February 3, 1996) was a player in the National Football League.

Biography
Harold Alfred "Tex" Hinte Sr. was born on 25 Jan 1920 in Mount Hope, Fayette County, West Virginia., a son of William Hinte and Rosie Bertha Traynor Hinte.  He died on 03 Feb 1996 in Jacksonville, Duval County, Fla., and was buried in Riverside Memorial Park, Jacksonville.

Career
Hinte played with the Pittsburgh Steelers and the Green Bay Packers during the 1942 NFL season. He played at the collegiate level at the University of Pittsburgh.

See also
List of Pittsburgh Steelers players
List of Green Bay Packers players

References

1920 births
1996 deaths
Pittsburgh Steelers players
Green Bay Packers players
Pittsburgh Panthers football players
Players of American football from Pittsburgh